Rajnikant Trivedi (born 4 January 1940) is an Indian first-class cricketer who represented Rajasthan. He made his first-class debut for Rajasthan in the 1963-64 Ranji Trophy on 9 November 1963.

References

External links
 

1940 births
Living people
Indian cricketers
Rajasthan cricketers